Daniel H. Jenkins (born January 17, 1963) is an American actor, best known for his stage work on Broadway, including his 1985 role as Huckleberry Finn in Roger Miller's Big River, for which he was nominated for a Tony Award.

Personal life
Jenkins was born to actors Ken Jenkins and Joan Patchen. He acted in high school plays and community theatre, before enrolling in the apprentice program at Actors Theatre of Louisville. In 1986, Jenkins and his father both appeared together on Broadway in the musical Big River.

Career
Jenkins was nominated for a Tony Award in 1985 for his role as Huckleberry Finn in Big River, his Broadway debut. In 2003, he performed in the Tony nominated "Deaf West" signed revival of Big River, this time portraying Mark Twain and also performing as the voice for signed character Huckleberry Finn. Jenkins has had notable performances in several other Broadway musicals, including Mary Poppins, Billy Elliot, and Big The Musical.

On screen, Jenkins played one of the lead roles in Robert Altman's film O.C. and Stiggs, shot in 1983 but not released until 1987,. He again worked with Altman in his 1988 miniseries Tanner '88. On HBO he appeared on the cable channel's adventure film Florida Straits costarring alongside Raul Julia and Fred Ward. Other notable appearances include: The Caine Mutiny Court-Martial (TV Movie), Cradle Will Rock, The Good Wife, Veep, and Orange Is The New Black.

In October 2008, Jenkins, along with Robert Stanton, wrote and performed in the play Love Child: Only Two Men on Stage, but They Turn Into a Crowd at New World Stages in New York City.

Stage workBig River - Huckleberry Finn Angels in America: Millennium Approaches - Prior Walter Angels in America: Perestroika - Prior Walter Big (musical) - Josh Baskin Wrong Mountain - Clifford Pike / StevensMary Poppins (musical) - George Banks Billy Elliot - Dad Golden Boy - BarkerOslo -  Jan Egeland / Ron PundakKid Victory'' (Off-Broadway musical) - Dad / Joseph.

References

External links

1963 births
Living people
American male stage actors
American male film actors